Sophie Latham (née Birdsall;  – 10 September 1867) was First Lady of California as wife of Milton Latham, Governor from 9 to 14 January 1860.

Life
Latham was born around 1835 in Yates County, New York, to Lewis A. Birdsall and Mary Jane Lee.

Sophie was a favorite of Sacramento and San Francisco society, and was known by the soubriquet the "Belle of the Prairie."  In 1853, her father, Lewis, was appointed as the first Superintendent of the San Francisco Mint. Sophie married Milton Latham in San Francisco, on 1 October 1853.  They had no children.  Milton was governor for five days before he was elected to the United States Senate, filling the vacancy created by David Broderick's death.  Milton was not re-elected and they moved back to San Francisco.  

Latham died 10 September 1867 and was buried at the Laurel Hill Cemetery in San Francisco. Both Sophie and Milton were moved to the Cypress Lawn Memorial Park in Colma around 1940, when the cemetery was closed due to an ordinance prohibiting graveyards within city limits.

References

1830s births
1867 deaths
People from San Francisco
People from Yates County, New York
First Ladies and Gentlemen of California
Burials at Cypress Lawn Memorial Park
Burials at Laurel Hill Cemetery (San Francisco)